Rubus parliniiis a rare North American species of flowering plant in the rose family. It is native to  the northeastern United States (Maine, Vermont, Connecticut).

The genetics of Rubus is extremely complex, so that it is difficult to decide on which groups should be recognized as species. There are many rare species with limited ranges such as this. Further study is suggested to clarify the taxonomy. Some studies have suggested that R. parlinii may have originated as a hybrid between R. setosus and R. hispidus.

References

parlinii
Plants described in 1947
Flora of the Northeastern United States
Flora without expected TNC conservation status